Fréhel (Gallo: Fèrhaèu) is a commune in the Côtes-d'Armor department of Brittany in northwestern France.

This commune was previously named Pléhérel. Between 1972 and 2004, the commune of Plévenon was merged with Pléhérel and the combination of the two took the name of Fréhel, drawn from the name of Cap Fréhel, on which both communes were located. However, in 2004, Plévenon became once again a distinct commune, while Pléhérel retained the name of the commune of Fréhel.

Population

The inhabitants of Fréhel are known in French as fréhélois.

International relations
Fréhel is twinned with  Mafra, Portugal
And Buncrana, Co. Donegal, Ireland

See also
Communes of the Côtes-d'Armor department
Fort-la-Latte
Sables-d'Or-les-Pins

References

External links

Official website 

Cap Fréhel and its lighthouses 

Communes of Côtes-d'Armor